The 1965–66 daytime network television schedule for the three major English-language commercial broadcast networks in the United States covers the weekday daytime hours from September 1965 to August 1966.

Talk shows are highlighted in yellow, local programming is white, reruns of prime-time programming are orange, game shows are pink, soap operas are chartreuse, news programs are gold and all others are light blue. New series are highlighted in bold.

Monday-Friday
{| class=wikitable style="font-size:90%"
! width="1.5%" bgcolor="#C0C0C0" colspan="2"|Network
! width="4%" bgcolor="#C0C0C0"|7:00 am
! width="4%" bgcolor="#C0C0C0"|7:30 am
! width="4%" bgcolor="#C0C0C0"|8:00 am
! width="4%" bgcolor="#C0C0C0"|8:30 am
! width="4%" bgcolor="#C0C0C0"|9:00 am
! width="4%" bgcolor="#C0C0C0"|9:30 am
! width="4%" bgcolor="#C0C0C0"|10:00 am
! width="4%" bgcolor="#C0C0C0"|10:30 am
! width="4%" bgcolor="#C0C0C0"|11:00 am
! width="4%" bgcolor="#C0C0C0"|11:30 am
! width="4%" bgcolor="#C0C0C0"|noon
! width="4%" bgcolor="#C0C0C0"|12:30 pm
! width="4%" bgcolor="#C0C0C0"|1:00 pm
! width="4%" bgcolor="#C0C0C0"|1:30 pm
! width="4%" bgcolor="#C0C0C0"|2:00 pm
! width="4%" bgcolor="#C0C0C0"|2:30 pm
! width="4%" bgcolor="#C0C0C0"|3:00 pm
! width="4%" bgcolor="#C0C0C0"|3:30 pm
! width="4%" bgcolor="#C0C0C0"|4:00 pm
!4:30 pm
!5:00 pm
!5:30 pm
!6:00 pm
!6:30 pm
|-
! rowspan="4" bgcolor="#C0C0C0" |ABC
! Fall
| colspan="8" rowspan="4" |Local
| colspan="2" bgcolor="gold" |The Young Set
| rowspan="4" bgcolor="orange" |The Donna Reed Show 
| rowspan="4" bgcolor="orange" |Father Knows Best 
| colspan="2" rowspan="4" bgcolor="orange" |Ben Casey 
| rowspan="2" bgcolor="chartreuse" |The Nurses
| rowspan="4" bgcolor="chartreuse" |A Time for Us2:55 pm: News with the Women's Touch| rowspan="4" bgcolor="chartreuse" |General Hospital| rowspan="2" bgcolor="chartreuse" |The Young Marrieds| rowspan="3" bgcolor="chartreuse" |Never Too Young4:25 pm: Arlene Dahl's Beauty Spot In COLOR (effective 3/28)
| rowspan="4" bgcolor="yellow" |Where the Action Is| colspan="2" rowspan="4" |Local
| rowspan="4" bgcolor="gold" |Peter Jennings with the News6:15: Local
| rowspan="4" |Local
|-
!December
| rowspan="3" bgcolor="pink" |Supermarket Sweep| rowspan="3" bgcolor="pink" |The Dating Game|-
!Spring
| bgcolor="chartreuse" |Confidential for Women| rowspan="2" bgcolor="chartreuse" |The Nurses|-
!Summer
| bgcolor="pink" |The Newlywed Game| bgcolor="chartreuse" |Dark Shadows|-
! colspan="2" bgcolor="#C0C0C0" |CBS
| bgcolor="gold" |7:05: CBS Morning News (In COLOR starting 8/29)
|Local
| colspan="2" bgcolor="bf9fef" |Captain Kangaroo| colspan="2" bgcolor="white" |Local
| bgcolor="orange" |I Love Lucy 
| bgcolor="orange" |The Real McCoys 
| bgcolor="orange" |Andy Of Mayberry 
| bgcolor="orange" |The Dick Van Dyke Morning Show 
| bgcolor="chartreuse" |Love of Life12:25: CBS News| bgcolor="chartreuse" |12:30: Search for Tomorrow12:45: The Guiding Light|Local
| bgcolor="chartreuse" |As the World Turns| bgcolor="pink" |Password| bgcolor="yellow" |Art Linkletter's House Party (In COLOR starting 9/13)
| bgcolor="pink" |To Tell the Truth3:25: CBS News| bgcolor="chartreuse" |The Edge of Night| bgcolor="chartreuse" |The Secret Storm| colspan="4" |Local
| bgcolor="gold" |CBS Evening News (In COLOR starting 1/31)
|-                                                                                                                  
! rowspan="5" bgcolor="#C0C0C0" |NBC
!Fall
| colspan="4" rowspan="5" bgcolor="gold" |Today (In COLOR starting 9/13)
| colspan="2" rowspan="5" bgcolor="white" |Local
| rowspan="2" bgcolor="pink" |Fractured Phrases (In COLOR starting 9/27)10:25: NBC News| rowspan="5" bgcolor="pink" |Concentration| rowspan="4" bgcolor="chartreuse" |Morning Star (In COLOR starting 9/27)
| rowspan="4" bgcolor="chartreuse" |Paradise Bay (In COLOR starting 9/27)
| rowspan="5" bgcolor="pink" |Jeopardy! In COLOR
| rowspan="3" bgcolor="pink" |Let's Play Post Office In COLOR12:55 pm: NBC News| rowspan="5" bgcolor="white" |Local
| rowspan="5" bgcolor="pink" |Let's Make a Deal In COLOR1:55 pm: NBC News
| bgcolor="chartreuse" |Moment of Truth| rowspan="5" bgcolor="chartreuse" |The Doctors| rowspan="5" bgcolor="chartreuse" |Another World (In COLOR starting 6/20)
| rowspan="5" bgcolor="pink" |You Don't Say! In COLOR
| rowspan="5" bgcolor="pink" |The Match Game In COLOR4:25: NBC News| colspan="4" rowspan="5" |Local
| rowspan="5" bgcolor="gold" |The Huntley–Brinkley Report (In COLOR starting 11/15)
|-
!November
| rowspan="4" bgcolor="chartreuse" |Days of Our Lives In COLOR
|-
!Winter
| rowspan="3" bgcolor="pink" |Eye Guess In COLOR10:25: NBC News
|-
!Summer
| rowspan="2" bgcolor="yellow" |Swinging Country In COLOR12:55 pm: NBC News
|-
!July
| bgcolor="pink" |Chain Letter In COLOR
| bgcolor="pink" |Showdown In COLOR
|}

Saturday

Sunday

By network
ABC

Returning series:ABC NewsAnnie Oakley Beany and Cecil The Bugs Bunny Show The Bullwinkle Show The Donna Reed Show Directions '66DiscoveryFather Knows Best General HospitalHoppity HooperIssues and AnswersNews with the Woman's TouchThe New Casper Cartoon ShowThe New American Bandstand 1966Peter Jennings with the NewsThe Porky Pig ShowShenanigansA Time for UsWhere the Action IsThe Young MarriedsNew series:Arlene Dahl's Beauty SpotThe BeatlesBen Casey Confidential for WomenDark ShadowsThe Dating GameHello, Peapickers starring Tennessee Ernie FordThe Magilla Gorilla Show The Milton the Monster ShowNever Too YoungThe Newlywed GameThe NursesThe Rebus GameShenanigansSupermarket SweepThe Young SetNot returning from 1964-65:Buffalo Bill, Jr. Day in CourtGet the MessageHello, Peapickers starring Tennessee Ernie FordThe Magic Land of AllakazamMissing LinksThe Price Is Right Trailmaster 

CBS

Returning series:Andy Of Mayberry Art Linkletter's House PartyAs the World TurnsCamera ThreeCaptain KangarooThe CBS Saturday NewsCBS Evening NewsCBS Morning News with Mike WallaceCBS NewsThe Edge of NightFace the NationThe Guiding LightThe Heckle and Jeckle Cartoon ShowI Love Lucy Lamp Unto My FeetLassie Linus the LionheartedLook Up and LiveLove of LifeMighty Mouse PlayhouseMy Friend Flicka PasswordThe Quick Draw McGraw Show The Real McCoys Search for TomorrowThe Secret StormSky King Tennessee Tuxedo and His TalesTed Mack’s Amateur HourTo Tell the TruthNew series:The Dick Van Dyke Morning Show Tom and JerryNot returning from 1964-65:The Alvin Show The Jack Benny Daytime Show The Jetsons  Mister EdWorld War OneNBC

Returning series:Another WorldAstro BoyThe Bell Telephone Hour / Actuality Specials (continued into primetime)
 Catholic HourConcentrationThe DoctorsExploring Eternal LightThe First LookFrontiers of FaithFury Jeopardy!The Jetsons  Let's Make a DealMatch GameMeet the PressMoment of TruthNBC NewsNBC Saturday Night NewsNBC Sunday Night NewsOpen MindSports in ActionThe Today ShowTop Cat UnderdogYou Don't Say!New series:The Atom Ant ShowChain LetterDays of Our LivesEye GuessFractured PhrasesLet's Play Post OfficeMorning StarParadise BayThe Secret Squirrel ShowShowdownSwinging CountryNot returning from 1964-65:Call My BluffThe Danny Thomas Show/Make Room for Daddy Dennis the Menace Fireball XL5The Hector Heathcote ShowI'll BetThe Loretta Young Theater Profiles in CourageSay When!Truth or ConsequencesWhat's This Song?See also
1965-66 United States network television schedule (prime-time)
1965-66 United States network television schedule (late night)

Sources
Castleman & Podrazik, The TV Schedule Book'', McGraw-Hill Paperbacks, 1984
TV GUIDE, Volume 14, No. 25, New York Metropolitan Edition, June 18–24, 1966

United States weekday network television schedules
1965 in American television
1966 in American television